The earliest form of Christianity in India was that adopted by the Saint Thomas Christians in Kerala in the 1st century. This diversified into different churches as time went by. Later, Roman Catholic and Protestant denominations were introduced by European missionaries and colonisers.

A
Aaradhanalaya Church of India
Advent Christian Conference
Amazing Grace Ministries
Andhra Evangelical Lutheran Church
Anglican Church of India (Continuing Anglican)
Apatani Christian Fellowship
Apostolic Christian Assembly
Apostolic Church of Pentecost
Apostolic Evangelical Church of India
Anglican Church of India
Arise and shine missionary diocese
Apostolic Fellowship Tabernacle
Apostolic Pentecostal Church
Apostolic Trinity Ministries
Asia Evangelistic Fellowship
Assam Baptist Convention
Assemblies Jehovah Shammah
Assemblies of Christ Church
Assemblies of God
Assemblies of Jesus Christ
Assembly Hall Churches
Assembly of Believers Church
Association of Vineyard Churches
Assyrian Church of the East

B
Baptist Christian Association
Baptist Church of Mizoram
Baptist Union of North India
Bengal Baptist Fellowship
Believers Eastern Church adhere to orthodox faith
Bengal-Orissa-Bihar Baptist Convention
Bethany Fellowship Ministries 
Bethel Pentecostal Church
Bharatiya Jukta Christa Prachar Mandali
Bible Brethren Fellowship
Bible Christian Mission
Bible Pattern Church
Bible Presbyterian Church
Biblical Church Indian Synod of Dioceses
Bihar Mennonite Mandli
Blessing Youth Mission
Brethren in Christ Church in India
Bro Bakht Singh Assemblies(All over the World)
Brethren Assembly (All over the World)

C
Cachar Hill Tribes Synod
Carmel Gospel Missions
 Catholic Church
Roman Catholic Church (Latin rite)
Syro-Malabar Catholic Church
Carmel Church (kothapatnam)
Philips Carmel Church Diocese
Syro-Malankara Catholic Church
Chaldean Syrian Church
Christ Groups
Christadelphians
Christian Believers' Assembly Fellowship, Kota(Raj.)
Christian Congregation in India
Christian Fellowship Centre
Christian Revival Church
Church Of Episcopal Fellowship International Diocese (CEFI Diocese)
Church of God (Anderson)
Church of God (Full Gospel) in India
Church of God of Prophecy
Church of God (Seventh Day)
Church of North India
Church of South India
Church of the Apostolic Faith
Church of the Nazarene
Churches of Christ
Churches of Christ in Western India
Churches of Christ (Instrumental)
Churches of Christ (Non-Instrumental)
Council of Baptist Churches in Northern India
Council of Reformed Churches in India
Celtic Cross Ministries India

D
Deliverance City Church
Diocese of Cosmopolis
Disciples of Christ
 Divyadarshana Ministries
Dohnavur Fellowship
 Dwarka Christian Fellowship

E
Elim Church
Elite Jesus Ministries Welfare Society
El Shaddai
Ecumenical Catholic Church of Christ in India 
Eternal Light Ministries
Eternal Life International Ministries
Evangelical Alliance of Churches
Evangelical Church of India
Evangelical Church of Maraland
Evangelical Congregational Church
Evangelical Free Church of India
Evangelical Missionary Society in Mayurbhanj
Evangelical Presbyterian Church of Sikkim
 Eternal rock ministry

F
Fellowship of Evangelical Friends
Fellowship of Gospel Churches
Fellowship of Indigenous Gospel Churches
Filadelfia Fellowship Church of India
Free Methodist Church of India
Friends Missionary Prayer Band
Faith Gospel Mission Kerala

G
Garment India Ministries
Garo Baptist Convention
Good News Mission (Apostle.M. Rajendran)
Gospel Association of India
Gospel Echoing Missionary Society
Geoffrey Ministries Chennai Tamil Nadu
Gospel Outreach Ministries
Gypsy Evangelical Movement
Global Christian Church Of India
Greek Orthodox Church 
Gossner Evangelical Lutheran Church in Chotanagpur and Assam

H
Harvest Church India
Hebron church Of Almighty God
Hebron Missionary Fellowship
Himalaya Evangelical Mission
Himalayan Free Church
Hindustani Covenant Church
Highland churches of India
House of Prayer Fellowship
Holy Almighty God Ministries
Holy Way Ministries Trust
Hosanna ministries 
Holy ministries

I
Immanuel India Mission
Immanuel Pentecostal Assembly
Independent Assemblies of God, International
Independent Baptist Ministries Of India
Independent Church of India
India Association of General Baptists
India for Christ Ministries
India United Evangelical Mission
India Evangelistic Mission
Indian Brethren
Indian Evangelical Team(IET-New Delhi)
Indian National Church
Indian National Full Gospel Churches Federation of India
India Pentecostal Assembly(Full Gospel)
Indian Pentecostal Mission
Indian Pentecostal Church of God
International Christian Fellowship
International Church of the Foursquare Gospel
India Evangelical Lutheran Church
India Evangelical Lutheran Church IELC
Indian missionaries society

J
Jesus Evangelical Mission 
Jesus with us Revival Church (Rev. Dr. P.Charles )
Jehovah's Witnesses
Jehovah Salvation Church
Jeypore Evangelical Lutheran Church
 *Jesus Mariya Christeen ministries

K
Karbi-Anglong Baptist Convention
Karnataka Baptist Convention
Kashmir Evangelical Fellowship
Kuki Christian Church
 Knanaya

L

Lambsaved Ministries
Latin Catholic Church
Local Churches of India
 Life Boat Church
London Mission Church
Lord Jesus Christ Tabernacle
 Laymen's Evangelical Fellowship
 Lutheran
Logos Faith Foundation

M
Madras Pentecostal Assembly (Tamil)
Mahanaim Christian Mission (Assembly of Holy God church)
Mahaneh Dan Fellowship
Maranatha gospel church
Maranatha Ministries International
Manipur Baptist Convention
Malankara Mar Thoma Syrian Church
Mara Independent Evangelical Church
Maranatha Full Gospel Churches
Mennonite Church in India
Methodist Church in India
Metropolitan Church Association
Mission Society of Mar Gregorios of India
Mission India
Moravian Church
Malankara Evangelical Church

N
New Creation Family Church
Nagaland Baptist Church Council
National Missionary Society of India
Native Missionary Movement
Navajeeva Ashram
National Church of India
National Church of India Missionary Diocese of Kerala 
New India Church Of God
New Life Churches
New Life Fellowship Association
New Life Outreach
New Testament Church of India
North Bank Baptist Christian Association
Northern Evangelical Lutheran Church
North India Tribal Mission
North Western Gossner Evangelical Lutheran Church

O
Open Bible Church of God
Orissa Missionary Movement
Orissa Baptist Evangelistic Crusade
 Oriental Orthodox Churches
 Malankara Orthodox Syrian Church
 Jacobite Syrian Orthodox Church
 Malabar Independent Syrian Church

P
Pentecostal Free Will Baptist Church
Pentecostal Holiness Church
Presbyterian Church of India
Prince of Peace Church

Q

R
Rabha Baptist Church Union
Reaching Indians Ministries
Rajasthan Bible Institute
Reformed Episcopal Church
Reformed Presbyterian Church of India
Reformed Presbyterian Church North East India
Rongmei Baptist Churches Council (formerly, Rongmei Naga Baptist Association)

S
St Thomas Evangelical Church of India
Salvation Light Ministries
Separate Baptists in Christ
Seventh Day Baptist Church
Seventh-day Adventist Church
South India Reformed Churches
Sharon fellowship church
Shekinah Assembly
Suvartha full gospel church
salvation army SHALOM TEMPLE
SMYRNA Theological UNIVERSITY
Synod of Independent Pentecostal Church
Faith Gospel Mission

T
Tamil Baptist Churches
Tamil Christian Fellowship
Telugu Baptist Church
The Church of Jesus Christ of Latter-day Saints in India
The Salvation Army
St. Mari Church Of India
The Pentecostal Mission
Tribal Gospel Mission
Tripura Baptist Christian Union
Tamil Evangelical Lutheran Church
The Santal Mission of the Northern Churches
The Living Evangelical Fellowship 
 The Worldwide Anglican Church of India
Tirunelveli C.M.S. Evangelical Church

U
Undenominational Church of the Lord in India
Union of Evangelical Students of India
United Basel Mission Church
United Evangelical Lutheran Church in India
United Missionary Church of India
United Pentecostal Church in India
United Church of North India (UCNI)
United Christ Covenant Church (UCCCM)

V
Vishwasi Mandir (Aatmik Vishwavidyalaya)

W
Wesleyan Church of India

X

Y
Yeshuva Evangelical Church

Z
Zeme Baptist Church Council

See also
 List of Christian denominations in North East India
Christian Revival Church
Christianity in India

References

World Christian Encyclopedia 2nd edition (Oxford University Press, 2001), first volume 

India
India religion-related lists
India